Through his grandchildren, Paul I of Russia is an ancestor of many European royals.

 Margrethe II of Denmark is a 4x great-grandchild through her great-great grandfather Grand Duke Michael Nicolaevich of Russia
 Beatrix of the Netherlands is a 3x great-grandchild through her great-grandfather William III of the Netherlands
 Carl XVI Gustaf of Sweden is a 5x great-grandchild though his great-great-great grandmother Augusta of Saxe-Weimar
 Charles III is a 4x great-grandchild through his great-great grandfather Grand Duke Constantine Nicholaievich of Russia

Paul I, with his wife Maria Feodorovna (Sophie Dorothea of Württemberg) had the following grandchildren:

House of Holstein-Gottorp-Romanov
Paul I of Russia